Micrargeriella is a monotypic genus of flowering plants belonging to the family Orobanchaceae. The only species is Micrargeriella aphylla.

Its native range is Southern Tropical Africa.

References

Orobanchaceae
Orobanchaceae genera
Monotypic Lamiales genera